This is a list of articles related to Northern Ireland. For a list of topics related to the island of Ireland, see the list of Ireland-related topics; for a list of topics related to the United Kingdom, see the Outline of the United Kingdom.

This is a list of Northern Ireland–related topics. is a part of the United Kingdom in the north-east of the island of Ireland. It is variously described as a country, province or region of the UK, amongst other terms. The following list of topics relating to Northern Ireland are grouped alphabetically.

Architecture

 Abbeys and priories in Northern Ireland
 Historic houses in Northern Ireland
 Laganside Corporation
 List of castles in Northern Ireland
 List of National Trust properties in Northern Ireland
 Market Houses in Northern Ireland
 Obel Tower
 Victoria Square, Belfast
 Windsor House

 Communications 

.uk
BT Group
IE Domain Registry
Nominet UK

 Culture 

Apprentice Boys of Derry
Celt
Celtic calendar
Gaels
Irish art
List of Northern Irish artists
The Ormeau Baths Gallery
The Ulster Museum
Irish dance
Irish diaspora
Irish mythology
Cúchulainn
Ulster Cycle
Irish people
Irish poetry
Irish theatre
List of Irish dramatists
Irish traditional music
Irish Traveller
List of Irish ballads
Billy Boys
The Boyne Water
Come Out Ye Black and Tans
Danny Boy
Four Green Fields
Ireland's Call
Lillibullero
Londonderry Air
The Men Behind the Wire
The Mountains of Mourne
The Patriot Game
There Were Roses
The Town I Loved So Well
The Sash
Star of the County Down
List of Irish people
List of Northern Irish people
Modern Celts
National symbols
Harp
Red Hand of Ulster
Shamrock
Northern Irish murals
The Orange Order
Orange walk
Pejoratives
Fenian
Millie
MOPE
Paddy
Spide
Taig
West Brit
Hun
Orangie
Prod
Prostitution
Royal Black Preceptory
Saint Patrick's Day

 Economy 

The "Big Four"
Bank of Ireland
First Trust Bank
Northern Bank
Ulster Bank
British Civil Service
DeLorean Motor Company
Economic history of Ireland
Economy of Northern Ireland
Harland and Wolff
Irish linen
Northern Ireland Electricity
Northern Irish banknotes
Short Brothers
Tayto (Northern Ireland)

 Education 

Council for the Curriculum, Examinations and Assessment
Education in Northern Ireland
Department of Education
Department for Employment and Learning
List of Irish learned societies
List of primary schools in Northern Ireland
List of secondary schools in Northern Ireland
List of grammar schools in Northern Ireland
List of integrated schools in Northern Ireland
List of universities in Northern Ireland
Belfast Education and Library Board
North Eastern Education and Library Board
South Eastern Education and Library Board
Southern Education and Library Board
Western Education and Library Board
Integrated Education
Union of Students in Ireland

 Foods 

Barmbrack
Irish breakfast
Irish cuisine
Irish stew
Irish whiskey
Potato bread
Soda bread
Ulster fry
Veda bread

 History 
Anglo-Irish
Anglo-Irish War (1919)
Anglo-Irish Treaty (1921)
Anglo-Irish Agreement (1985)
Annals of Ulster
Battle of the Boyne
Belfast blitz
Black and Tans
Catholic Emancipation
Coat of arms of Northern Ireland
Erin
Hibernia
History of Belfast
History of Ireland
History of Northern Ireland
Irish states since 1171
Lordship of Ireland (1171–1541)
Kingdom of Ireland (1541–1800)
Confederate Ireland (1641–1649)
United Kingdom of Great Britain and Ireland (1801–1922)
Northern Ireland (1921–present)
Southern Ireland (1921–22)
Irish Republic (1919–22)
Irish Free State (1922–37)
Ireland/Éire (1937–present), or more generally called Republic of Ireland (1949–present)
Operation Green
Plan W
Plantation of Ulster
Scotia
Ulaid

 Ideologies 

Nationalists
Republicanism
Irish National Liberation Army
Irish Republican Army
Official IRA
Provisional IRA
Continuity IRA
Real IRA
Irish Republican Brotherhood
Unionists
Loyalist
Red Hand Commandos
Ulster Defence Association (Ulster Freedom Fighters)
Ulster Young Militants
Ulster Volunteer Force
Loyalist Volunteer Force

 Language 

Celtic languages
Proto-Celtic language
Insular Celtic languages
Goidelic languagesGaelicOgham
Primitive Irish language
Old Irish language
Middle Irish language
Irish language
Ulster Irish
Irish initial mutations
Irish language in Northern Ireland
Irish morphology
Irish name
Irish nominals
Irish orthography
Irish phonology
Irish surnames
Irish syntax
Irish verbs
Irish words used in the English language
Modern literature in Irish
Place names in Irish
Words of Irish origin
Hiberno-English
Mid Ulster English
Scots language
Ulster Scots dialectsLawThe Administration of Justice (Language) Act (Ireland) 1737
European Charter for Regional or Minority LanguagesPublic bodies''
Foras na Gaeilge
The North/South Language Body
Ulster-Scots Agency

Law 

Articles 2 and 3 of the Constitution of Ireland
Belfast Agreement ("Good Friday Agreement")
Government of Ireland Act 1920
List of High Court Judges of Northern Ireland
Northern Ireland Act 1998
Northern Ireland law
Police Service of Northern Ireland (formerly the Royal Ulster Constabulary)

Local government
Local government in Northern Ireland
Waste management
ARC21
NWRWMG
SWaMP

Media 

Newspapers
The Belfast Telegraph
The Irish News
List of newspapers in Ireland
List of newspapers in the United Kingdom
The News Letter
Vacuum newspaper
Sunday Life
Radio
BBC Radio Foyle
BBC Radio Ulster
Bangor FM
Belfast CityBeat
Castle FM
Cool FM
Downtown Radio
Raidió Fáilte
Television
BBC Northern Ireland
BBC Two Northern Ireland
List of British television channels
List of Irish television channels
UTV

Music 

Artists
Iain Archer
Derek Bell
Phil Coulter
Nadine Coyle
Peter Cunnah
Dana
The Divine Comedy
James Galway
David Holmes
Brian Kennedy
Tommy Makem
Henry McCullough
Gary Moore
Van Morrison
Snow Patrol
Stiff Little Fingers
The Undertones
Therapy?
Ulster Orchestra

Officials 

First Minister of Northern Ireland
Historical
Chief Secretary for Ireland
High King of Ireland
King of Ireland
Lord Chancellor of Ireland
Lord Chief Justice of Ireland
Lord Lieutenant of Ireland
Order of precedence in Northern Ireland
Order of St. Patrick
Prime Minister of Northern Ireland
Secretary of State for Northern Ireland

Places 
Areas of Outstanding Natural Beauty in Northern Ireland
Bangor, County Down
Belfast Lough
Belfast Zoo
Castles in Northern Ireland
Cavehill
Cities
Armagh
Belfast
Derry (also called Londonderry)
Lisburn
Newry
Corrymeela Community
Counties of Ireland
Derry-Londonderry name dispute
Emain Macha (known in English as Navan Fort)
Gardens in Northern Ireland
Geography of Ireland
Giant's Causeway
Heritage railways in Northern Ireland
Historic houses in Northern Ireland
Islands of the North Atlantic
Lighthouses in Ireland
List of Irish loughs
List of museums in Northern Ireland
List of towns in Northern Ireland
List of UNESCO World Heritage Sites in the United Kingdom
Lough Neagh
Market Houses in Northern Ireland
Mourne Mountains
National Nature Reserves in Northern Ireland
Parliament Buildings
Provinces of Ireland
River Lagan
Special Areas of Conservation in Northern Ireland
Tourist destinations in Ireland
Townlands

Politics 
Celtic League
Demographics and politics of Northern Ireland
Flag of Northern Ireland
List of political parties in Northern Ireland
Segregation in Northern Ireland
Present
Alliance Party of Northern Ireland
Conservatives in Northern Ireland
Democratic Unionist Party
Green Party
Progressive Unionist Party
Sinn Féin
Social Democratic and Labour Party
Traditional Unionist Voice
Ulster Unionist Party
Former
Northern Ireland Labour Party
Northern Ireland Unionist Party
Northern Ireland Women's Coalition
Protestant Unionist Party
Republican Labour Party
UK Unionist Party
Ulster Democratic Party
Ulster Loyalist Democratic Party
Ulster Popular Unionist Party
Unionist Party of Northern Ireland
Vanguard Progressive Unionist Party
Volunteer Political Party
North/South Ministerial Council
Northern Ireland Assembly
1st Northern Ireland Assembly
 2nd Northern Ireland Assembly
 3rd Northern Ireland Assembly
 4th Northern Ireland Assembly
 5th Northern Ireland Assembly
 6th Northern Ireland Assembly
 7th Northern Ireland Assembly
Northern Ireland peace process
Good Friday Agreement
First Minister and deputy First Minister of Northern Ireland
Northern Ireland Executive
Parliament of Northern Ireland
Prime Minister of Northern Ireland
Governor of Northern Ireland
Northern Ireland (European Parliament constituency)

Religion 

Abbeys and priories in Northern Ireland
Antiphonary of Bangor
Association of Baptist Churches in Ireland
Church of Ireland
Dioceses
Church of Ireland
Roman Catholic
Free Presbyterian Church of Ulster
Irish Catholic
List of cathedrals in Ireland
Methodist Church in Ireland
Non-subscribing Presbyterian Church of Ireland
Presbyterian Church in Ireland
Church House
General Assembly
Irish Presbyterians
Moderator
Union Theological College
Primates
Primate of All Ireland
Primate of Ireland
Reformed Presbyterian Church (denominational group)
Roman Catholicism in Ireland
Saint Malachy
Prophecy of the Popes
Saint Patrick

Science & technology

 Andor Technology
 InspecVision Ltd.
 Northbrook Technology

Sport 

2003 Special Olympics World Summer Games
Gaelic Games
Gaelic Athletic Association
Ulster GAA
All-Ireland Senior Football Championship
All-Ireland Senior Hurling Championship
Association Football
Irish Football Association
Irish Football League
National football team
Rugby
Irish Rugby Football Union
Ireland national rugby union team
Swim Ireland
Tennis Ireland
Basketball Ireland

Transport 
Airports
Belfast International Airport
City of Derry Airport
George Best Belfast City Airport
Common Travel Area
Rail transport in Ireland
Armagh rail disaster
History of rail transport in Ireland
Roads in Ireland
Translink
Metro (formerly Citybus)
Northern Ireland Railways
Ulsterbus
Transport in Ireland

The Troubles 

1981 Irish Hunger Strike
Michael Devine
Kieran Doherty
Francis Hughes
Martin Hurson
Kevin Lynch
Raymond McCreesh
Joe McDonnell
Thomas McElwee
Patsy O'Hara
Bobby Sands
Johnny Adair
Anti H-Block
Armalite and ballot box strategy
Arms Crisis
Battle of the Bogside
Birmingham pub bombings
Birmingham Six
Blanket protest
Bloody Friday
Bloody Sunday
Bloody Sunday Inquiry
Border Campaign (IRA)
Boundary Commission (Ireland)
British Military Intelligence Systems in Northern Ireland
Chronology of the Northern Ireland Troubles
Claudy bombing
Combined Loyalist Military Command
Conflict Archive on the Internet
Corporals killings
Council of Ireland
Crumlin Road Gaol
Directory of the Northern Ireland Troubles
Dirty protest
Denis Donaldson
Drumcree Church
Emergency Powers Act (Northern Ireland) 1926
Denis Faul
Pat Finucane
Five techniques
Flags and Emblems (Display) Act (Northern Ireland) 1954
Forced disappearance
Martin Galvin
Government of Ireland Act 1920
Governor of Northern Ireland
Guildford pub bombing
Guildford Four
Historical Enquiries Team
Holy Cross dispute
Independent Commission on Policing for Northern Ireland
Independent International Commission on Decommissioning
Irish War of Independence
Kingsmill massacre
Lord Mountbatten
Loyalist Association of Workers
Maguire Seven
Maze prison (also known as Long Kesh)
Michael McKevitt
Danny McNamee
Milltown Cemetery attack
George Mitchell
Mitchell Principles
Murder triangle
NORAID
Northern Campaign (IRA)
Northern Ireland Civil Rights Association
Northern Ireland Constitution Act 1973
Northern Ireland Constitutional Convention
Northern Ireland Forum
Northern Ireland peace process
Northern Ireland referendum, 1973
Northern Ireland referendum, 1998
Official Sinn Féin
Omagh bombing
Operation Demetrius (also known as Internment)
Operation Motorman
Peace lines
People's Democracy (Ireland)
Plan Kathleen
Provisional IRA campaign 1969–1997
Provisional IRA South Armagh Brigade
Remembrance Day Bombing
Repartition of Ireland
Saor Uladh
Sean O'Callaghan
Shoot-to-kill policy in Northern Ireland
Stakeknife
Freddie Scappaticci
Stevens Report
Sunningdale Agreement
Supergrass
TUAS
Tara
Thiepval Barracks
Third Force
Tout
Ulster Clubs
Ulster Defence Regiment
Ulster Defence Volunteers
Ulster Project
Ulster Resistance
Ulster Special Constabulary
Ulster Unionist Labour Association
Ulster Workers Council
Ulster Workers' Council Strike
Ulsterisation
Unity
Warrenpoint ambush

 Northern
 Topics
Outlines of countries